Shimazaki (written: ,  or ) is a Japanese surname. Notable people with the surname include:

Aki Shimazaki (born 1954), Canadian writer and translator
, Japanese idol and singer
, Japanese speed skater
, Japanese volleyball player
, Japanese voice actor
, Japanese footballer
, Imperial Japanese Navy admiral
, pen-name of Shimazaki Haruki, Japanese writer
, Japanese nativist

Japanese-language surnames